Anastasia Myskina was the defending champion, and also won the title in 2004.

Main draw

Seeds
The top four seeds received a bye into the second round.

Finals

Top half

Bottom half

References

External links
 wtatour.com website
 iftennis.com website

Qatar Ladies Open
Qatar Ladies Open
2004 in Qatari sport
Tennis in Qatar
Sport in Doha